G. G. Njuguna Ngengi (died January 2, 2008) was a Kenyan politician native to Molo, Kenya.

He came into international attention in 1993 when he and an assistant, Mr. Koigi wa Wamwere, were charged with violent robbery after they allegedly stormed the Bahati Police Station. They were sentenced to prison following a controversial trial in 1995, a move that was condemned by the European Union  and Amnesty International  among others. Ngengi was released in 1997.

Ngengi was a councillor in Molo before his sentence. He is also a former army captain.

His sister Josephine Nyawira Ngengi was arrested and charged in 1994 for allegedly robbing a supermarket.

Death

Ngengi was killed on January 2, 2008,  in Kuresoi during a meeting he was addressing in a bid to broker peace between the warring local communities following the controversial 2007 Kenyan presidential election. Several armed youth came in and shot Ngengi with a bow before they hacked him to death. According to Litabalia Achesa security was increased in the area following his death.

References

2008 deaths
Year of birth missing
Assassinated Kenyan politicians
People murdered in Kenya
Kenyan prisoners and detainees
Prisoners and detainees of Kenya